Edward R. Garvey (April 18, 1940 – February 22, 2017) was an American lawyer, politician and activist.

Background 
Garvey graduated from the University of Wisconsin (now the University of Wisconsin–Madison) and spent two years in the U.S. Army; he then returned to Madison and entered the University of Wisconsin Law School, where he earned a law degree.

Law and union work 

Soon after graduation, Garvey joined Lindquist & Vennum, a Minneapolis law firm. The firm worked for the National Football League Players Association (NFLPA), the labor organization representing the professional American football players in the National Football League (NFL), and in 1970 Garvey was assigned to counsel union president John Mackey regarding negotiations on a new four year contract with the league's owners. Garvey was later offered the position of executive director in the now-certified NFLPA in 1971.

Garvey served as its executive director until 1983, through two strikes (in 1974 and 1982) and frequently invoking antitrust legislation in his many court battles with the league. Garvey directed the NFLPA though a series of court battles that led, in 1975, to the ruling in Mackey v. NFL that antitrust laws applied to the NFL's restrictions on player movement. In 1976, armed with leverage regarding player movement from team to team, Garvey and the union won major concessions from the owners. Garvey's negotiations with the league exchanged the players' threat of pursuing a system of unfettered free agency for an improved package of player benefits.

The NFLPA became recognized by the owners as a full-fledged National Labor Relations Board union, and damages totaling $13.65 million were awarded to past and present players for antitrust violations against them.

After leaving the NFLPA 
After leaving the NFLPA, Garvey served as deputy attorney general in Wisconsin under Bronson La Follette, serving as the number-two official in the Wisconsin Department of Justice and specializing in environmental issues. Garvey also became a prominent leader with Wisconsin labor groups, particularly the Paperworkers Union (now United Steelworkers) in contract disputes with International Paper.

He organized the Fighting Bob Fest,  named for Robert M. La Follette

Political career 
Garvey was the editor and publisher of the political website FightingBob.com, which focused on Wisconsin and national issues from a progressive perspective. He regularly appeared on the local NPR national public radio affiliate WHAD to provide a progressive viewpoint on a variety of topics.

In 1986, Garvey ran for the U.S. Senate from Wisconsin, losing to Republican incumbent Bob Kasten by a small margin after a very bitter election. In an unsuccessful bid for Wisconsin governor in 1998 against three-term incumbent Tommy Thompson, Garvey sought to highlight campaign finance reform and limited contributions to his campaign to a fixed amount per donor. Thompson won by a wide margin.

Death 
Garvey died of complications from Parkinson's Disease at a nursing home in Verona, Wisconsin.

Electoral history

1986 U.S. Senate election

Democratic primary
Ed Garvey (D)
Matt Flynn (D)

General election
Bob Kasten (R) (inc.), 50.9% (754,573 votes)
Ed Garvey (D), 47.4% (702,963 votes)

1988 Democratic primary for U.S. Senate
Herb Kohl
Tony Earl
Ed Garvey
Doug La Follette

1998 gubernatorial election
Tommy Thompson (R) (inc.), 60%
Ed Garvey (D), 39%

References

Sources

Archived FightingBob, Garvey's blog.

External links
Fightin' Bob Fest

1940 births
2017 deaths
Executive Directors of the National Football League Players Association
Minnesota lawyers
People from Burlington, Wisconsin
Sports labor leaders
United States Army soldiers
Military personnel from Wisconsin
University of Wisconsin Law School alumni
Wisconsin lawyers
Wisconsin Democrats
Trade unionists from Wisconsin
20th-century American lawyers